Women Makes Waves is a film festival based in Taiwan since 1993. It is the first and only women's film festival in the country.

It is the largest women's film festival in Asia, and predates the Taipei Film Festival, which was founded in 1998. Since 2005, there is also an annual Asian Lesbian Film and Video Festival in Taipei, and since 2014, the annual Taiwan International Queer Film Festival (TIQFF), the only LGBTQ film festival in Taiwan, which has screenings every autumn in Taipei and two other major cities. 

In Chinese Women's Cinema: Transnational Contexts, edited by Lingzhen Wang, it is noted that the initial event at the Huo K'o Gallery in Taipei was called the Women's Visual Arts Festival. It was founded by the Taiwanese filmmaker Yu-shan Huang, supported by Lee Yuan-chen and other members of the Women Awakening magazine.

The film festival is organized by the Taiwan Women's Film Association (TFWA) which was established in 1998 with help from the Taiwan government and civic organisations, and was originally known as the Taipei Women's Film Association.

In 2001, it became the first touring film festival in Taiwan with the aim of reducing the urban-rural divide in access to cinema.

The film festival has screened nearly one thousand international and Taiwanese films, specialising in films of a feminist perspective, moving beyond the mainstream outlook to focus on voices and issues that are often unheard, explored and delighted in. The organization is also involved in distribution of films and books; it works in education and video training. The members of TWFA are mainly filmmakers, artists and academics of film or gender studies. Highlights from the film festival have also gone on an international tour including to New York.

See also
 Cinema of Taiwan
 List of women's film festivals

References

Film festivals in Taiwan
Women's film festivals
Recurring events established in 1993
1993 establishments in Taiwan